Allan Hunter may refer to:

 Allan Armstrong Hunter (born 1893), American writer
 Allan O. Hunter (1916–1995), American lawyer and politician
 Allan Hunter (cricketer) (1926–1982), New Zealand cricketer
 Allan Hunter (footballer) (born 1946), Northern Ireland-born footballer
 Allan Hunter (rugby union) (1922–2017), New Zealand rugby union player and schoolteacher

See also
Alan Hunter (disambiguation)
Al Hunter (disambiguation)